The Chimuara Solar Power Station, is a planned  solar power plant in Mozambique. The solar farm is under development by a consortium of two independent power producers and one investment company. The developers have created a special purpose vehicle (SPV) company called SunMoz, to design, build, own, operate and maintain the power station and related infrastructure. The energy generated here will be sold to Electricidade de Moçambique (EDM), for integration into the Mozambican grid, under a long-term power purchase agreement.

Location
The power station is located in the town of Chimuara, in the Zambezia Province, on the northern bank of the Zambezi River.

Overview
The design calls for a generation capacity of 100 megawatts, which will be sold directly to EDM, the electric utility company of Mozambique, for integration in the national electricity grid. EDM owns an electric substation in Chimuara, where the energy will be injected into the national grid. The power station will be developed in phases, with the first phase to comprise 30 MW.

Developers
The consortium that owns and is developing the solar farm has created an SPV company called SunMoz, to build own and operate the power station. The table below illustrates the shareholding in SunMoz.

See also

List of power stations in Mozambique

References

External links
 Chimuara Solar Park in Mozambique to be delivered following joint agreement As of 7 July 2022.

Solar power stations in Mozambique
Energy infrastructure in Africa
Zambezia Province